(also spelled ; is a Latin phrase, meaning "other things equal"; some other English translations of the phrase are "all other things being equal", "other things held constant", "all else unchanged", and "all else being equal". A statement about a causal, empirical, or logical relation between two states of affairs is ceteris paribus if it is acknowledged that the statement, although usually accurate in expected conditions, can fail because of, or the relation can be abolished by, intervening factors.

A ceteris paribus assumption is often key to scientific inquiry, because scientists seek to eliminate factors that perturb a relation of interest.  Thus epidemiologists, for example, may seek to control independent variables as factors that may influence dependent variables—the outcomes of interest.  Likewise, in scientific modeling, simplifying assumptions permit illustration of concepts considered relevant to the inquiry. An example in economics is "If the price of milk falls, ceteris paribus, the demand for milk will rise." This means that, if other factors, such as deflation, pricing objectives, utility, and marketing methods, do not change, the decrease in the price of milk will lead to an increase in demand for it.

In the philosophy of science, there is debate about ceteris paribus statements. In the logical empiricist view, fundamental physics tends to state universal laws, whereas other sciences, such as biology, and social sciences, such as economics and psychology, tend to state laws that hold true in normal conditions but have exceptions: ceteris paribus laws (cp laws).  The focus on universal laws is a criterion distinguishing fundamental physics as fundamental, whereas cp laws are predominant in most other sciences as special sciences, whose laws hold in special cases. This distinction assumes a logical empiricist view of science. It does not readily apply in a mechanistic understanding of scientific discovery. There is reasonable disagreement as to whether mechanisms or laws are the appropriate model; mechanisms are the favored method. Another possibility if we assume ceteris paribus in a scenario is the tendency to ignore many important factors that may play even greater roles in the measure of the dependent variable. Some assumptions tend to be highly unrealistic and can lead to wrong beliefs among scientists.

Economics 
Economics' ceteris paribus conditions include:
 The number of consumers in the market
 Consumer tastes or preferences
 Prices of substitute goods
 Consumer price expectations
 Personal income

Interpretation 
One of the disciplines in which ceteris paribus clauses are most widely used is economics, in which they are employed to simplify the formulation and description of economic outcomes. When using ceteris paribus in economics, one assumes that all other variables except those under immediate consideration are held constant. For example, it can be predicted that if the price of beef increases—ceteris paribus—the quantity of beef demanded by buyers will decrease. In this example, the clause is used to operationally describe everything surrounding the relationship between both the price and the quantity demanded of an ordinary good.

This operational description intentionally ignores both known and unknown factors that may also influence the relationship between price and quantity demanded, and thus to assume ceteris paribus is to assume away any interference with the given example. Such factors that would be intentionally ignored include: a change in the price of substitute goods, (e.g., the price of pork or lamb); a change in the level of risk aversion among buyers (e.g., due to an increase in the fear of mad cow disease); and a change in the level of overall demand for a good regardless of its current price (e.g., a societal shift toward vegetarianism).

The clause is often loosely translated as "holding all else constant." It does not imply that no other things will in fact change; rather, it isolates the effect of one particular change. Holding all other things constant  is directly analogous to using a partial derivative in calculus rather than a total derivative,  and to running a regression containing multiple variables rather than just one in order to isolate the individual effect of one of the variables. Ceteris paribus is an extension of scientific modeling. The scientific method is built on identifying, isolating, and testing the impact of an independent variable on a dependent variable.

One thing to note is that since economic variables can only be isolated in theory and not in practice, ceteris paribus can only ever highlight tendencies, not absolutes.

Alfred Marshall's characterization 

The clause is used to consider the effect of some causes in isolation, by assuming that other influences are absent. Alfred Marshall  expressed the use of the clause as follows:

Two uses 

The above passage by Marshall highlights two ways in which the ceteris paribus clause may be used: The one is hypothetical, in the sense that some factor is assumed fixed in order to analyse the influence of another factor in isolation. This would be hypothetical isolation. An example would be the hypothetical separation of the income effect and the substitution effect of a price change, which actually go together. The other use of the ceteris paribus clause is to see it as a means for obtaining an approximate solution. Here it would yield a substantive isolation.

Substantive isolation has two aspects: temporal and causal. Temporal isolation requires the factors fixed under the ceteris paribus clause to actually move so slowly relative to the other influence that they can be taken as practically constant at any point in time. So, if vegetarianism spreads very slowly, inducing a slow decline in the demand for beef, and the market for beef clears comparatively quickly, we can determine the price of beef at any instant by the intersection of supply and demand, and the changing demand for beef will account for the price changes over time (Temporary Equilibrium Method).

The other aspect of substantive isolation is causal isolation: those factors frozen under a ceteris paribus clause should not significantly be affected by the processes under study. If a change in government policies induces changes in consumers' behaviour on the same time scale, the assumption that consumer behaviour remains unchanged while policy changes is inadmissible as a substantive isolation (Lucas critique).

See also

Apples and oranges
Confounding
List of Latin phrases
Mutatis mutandis
Occam's razor
Partial derivative

Notes

References

External links

 
 
 
 Listen to Ceteris Paribus

Latin logical phrases
Latin philosophical phrases
Philosophy of science
Causality
Philosophy of economics